"Until It Sleeps" is a song by American heavy metal band Metallica, released on May 20, 1996, as the lead single from their sixth studio album Load. "Until It Sleeps" reached number ten on the Billboard Hot 100 making it Metallica's highest charting single and only top ten hit in the United States. The song was also their first number-one on the Billboard Hot Mainstream Rock Tracks chart, peaked in the top five in the United Kingdom, and reached number-one in Australia, Denmark, Finland, Hungary, and Sweden. The song's music video, directed by Samuel Bayer and inspired by the paintings of Hieronymus Bosch, won the Best Hard Rock Video award at the 1996 MTV Video Music Awards.

Versions
An early demo version of this song was entitled "F.O.B.D." (recorded on December 8, 1995) because it reminded the band members of the Soundgarden song "Fell on Black Days", in that the "It grips you...It stains you..." refrain is in the same 6/4 time signature that "Fell on Black Days" is in. The band can be heard saying "Fell on Black Days" on the fanclub-only Fancan 1 CD just prior to jamming on a portion of "Until It Sleeps". The 10-inch vinyl version of the single is red in color. Moby, credited as "Herman Melville", did an industrial-sounding remix used as a B-side.

"Until It Sleeps" became the first "officially" pirated MP3 when it was released by Compress 'Da Audio (a piracy group and spinoff of the Warez scene) via an Internet Relay Chat network on August 10, 1996. An EFnet member on the #mpeg3 IRC channel named Coyote666 was responsible for creating the first mp3 ripping software.

Moby produced a remix of the song, titled "Until It Sleeps (Herman Melville Mix)". The song was performed with orchestral accompaniment on the album S&M.

Lyrics
The lyrics of the song, written by Hetfield, address his mother's battle with cancer, to which the "it" in the title refers. They can be seen as either describing the emotional pain he feels for the loss, or the physical pain his mother was feeling while she was ill. Both of his parents were Christian Scientists, and did not believe in medicine. The lyrics are also interpreted as dealing with anger issues. Hetfield's father, Virgil, died in late 1996, during Metallica's Load tour.

Music video
The song also has a music video directed by Samuel Bayer (Nirvana, Green Day, The Smashing Pumpkins). It was shot in various locations around Los Angeles on May 6 and 7 in 1996. It was premiered by MTV on May 21. The video depicts surreal concepts dealing with the fall of man, taken from various paintings by Hieronymus Bosch. Apart from the general forms inspired from Bosch's paintings, the prominent figures in the video are the human-eating monster from The Garden of Earthly Delights, the fall of Adam and Eve from Haywain and Christ in the Crucifige Eum (Crucify Him) scene of Ecce Homo. The video won the MTV Video Music Award for Best Rock Video in 1996.

Awards
The song won a 1996 Metal Edge Readers' Choice Award for Song of the Year.

Track listings

Charts and certifications

Weekly charts

Year-end charts

Certifications

Release history

References

1990s ballads
1996 singles
1996 songs
American hard rock songs
Elektra Records singles
Hard rock ballads
Metallica songs
Music videos directed by Samuel Bayer
Number-one singles in Australia
Number-one singles in Denmark
Number-one singles in Finland
Number-one singles in Hungary
Number-one singles in Sweden
Song recordings produced by Bob Rock
Songs about diseases and disorders
Commemoration songs
Songs written by James Hetfield
Songs written by Lars Ulrich
Vertigo Records singles
Songs about cancer